Samoa competed at the 2017 Asian Indoor and Martial Arts Games held in Ashgabat, Turkmenistan from September 17 to 27. Samoa sent a delegation consisting of 15 athletes competing in 3 different sports. Iuniarra Sipaia was the only medalist in the event for Samoa as she claimed the bronze medal in the women's over 90 kg category.

Samoa made its debut in an Asian Indoor and Martial Arts Games for the first time at the Games held in Turkmenistan along with other Oceania nations.

Participants

Medallists

References 

Nations at the 2017 Asian Indoor and Martial Arts Games
2017 in Samoan sport